Elaphidionopsis fasciatipennis is a species of beetle in the family Cerambycidae, the only species in the genus Elaphidionopsis.

References

Elaphidiini